Agroeca pratensis is a species of liocranid sac spider in the family Liocranidae. It is found in the United States and Canada.

References

Liocranidae
Articles created by Qbugbot
Spiders described in 1890